Platyclades are flattened, photosynthetic shoots,  branches or stems that resemble or perform the function of leaves, as in Homalocladium platycladum and some cactus genera like Opuntia and Schlumbergera.

Etymology 
New Latin platycladium; from Greek platy, flat + klados, branch.
Plant morphology
Plant anatomy